Nathan Johnstone (born 9 February 1990) is a snowboarder from Australia. Johnstone won the gold medal at the 2011 FIS Snowboarding World Championships in the halfpipe. He finished ninth in the halfipe at the 2009 FIS Snowboarding World Championships.
Nathan started his career at a young age riding in the Perisher Winter Sports Club under coach Ben Alexander, who is still his current coach today.

References

External links
 FIS-Ski.com – Biography

1990 births
Living people
Australian male snowboarders
Snowboarders at the 2014 Winter Olympics
Snowboarders at the 2018 Winter Olympics
Olympic snowboarders of Australia